Moss Hill is an unincorporated community in Liberty County, Texas, United States.

Education
Moss Hill is zoned to schools in the Hardin Independent School District.

References

External links

Unincorporated communities in Liberty County, Texas
Unincorporated communities in Texas